Maqsudabad may refer to:

Maqsudabad, Mohammadabad, Marvdasht County, Fars Province
Maqsudabad, Rudbal, Marvdasht County, Fars Province
Maqsudabad, Sepidan, Sepidan County, Fars Province
Maqsudabad, Jahrom, Jahrom County, Fars Province
Maqsudabad, Kerman
Maqsudabad, Lorestan
Maqsudabad, alternate name of Masudabad, Lorestan
Maqsudabad, Saveh, Markazi Province
Maqsudabad, North Khorasan
Maqsudabad, Mashhad, Razavi Khorasan Province
Maqsudabad, Quchan, Razavi Khorasan Province
Maqsudabad, West Azerbaijan